Acoustic by Candlelight: Live on the Born Free tour is the first live album by actress and singer Kerry Ellis and rock musician Brian May, released on 17 June 2013. The 15-track album consists of material from live shows of the first leg of their Born Free Tour, which the pair embarked on in late 2012.

Track listing

Notes
 (*) Original songs written by Ellis and May
 (†) Songs originally by Queen

Release history 

2013 live albums
Kerry Ellis albums
Brian May albums